Ramaria subbotrytis is a species of coral fungus in the family Gomphaceae. It was originally described as Clavaria subbotrytis by William Chambers Coker in 1923 from collections made in North Carolina. E.J.H. Corner transferred it to the genus Ramaria in 1950. Ramaria subbotrytis accumulates arsenic and besides arsenobetaine contains a very unusual organoarsenic compound homoarsenocholine.

The species is edible.

References

Gomphaceae
Fungi described in 1923
Edible fungi
Fungi of North America